Anthology: Movie Themes 1974–1998 is the first compilation album by American film director and composer John Carpenter, released on October 20, 2017, through Sacred Bones Records. The album features re-recordings of Carpenter's best known film score themes, and was created in collaboration with Carpenter's son Cody Carpenter and his godson Daniel Davies. To coincide with the album's release, a remix of "Halloween" by Trent Reznor and Atticus Ross was also released.

Critical reception

Upon its release, Anthology: Movie Themes 1974–1998 received positive reviews from music critics.

Track listing

Included with the deluxe limited edition vinyl releases was a 7" single that had two tracks that were left off of the album.

Personnel
 John Carpenter – composition, performance, recording
 Cody Carpenter – performance, recording
 Daniel Davies – performance, recording

Additional personnel
 John Spiker – recording and bass on "In the Mouth of Madness"
 John Konesky – guitar on "In the Mouth of Madness"
 Scott Seiver – drums on "In the Mouth of Madness"
 Ben Lee – harmonica on "They Live"
 Jay Shaw – layout and design

Charts

References

External links
 

2017 albums
John Carpenter albums
Sacred Bones Records albums